Oswald Herbert Best (March 25, 1894 – July 1980) was a British-American author of children's literature and science fiction.

Early and personal life

Best was born on March 25, 1894. He married fellow author Allena Champlin, better known by her pen name Erick Berry. He held bachelor's degrees in arts and laws from Queens' College, Cambridge.

Career

Best published a number of books between the 1930s and '60s. Many of his works were for children, and illustrated by Berry. One of these was perhaps his most lauded work, Garram the Hunter: A Boy of the Hill Tribes, published in 1930. It won a Newbery Honor in 1931. He also wrote at least one work of science fiction, 1940's The Twenty-Fifth Hour.

Outside of his writing career, he fought in World War I and spent time working for the British Civil Service in Nigeria as an administrative officer. His experiences in Africa were significant influences on some of his works. He was a Fellow of the Royal Geographical Society.

Death

Best died in July 1980, at the age of 86.

Bibliography

 Garram the Hunter: A Boy of the Hill Tribes: 1930
 Flag of the Desert: 1936
 Tal of the Four Tribes: 1938
 The Twenty-Fifth Hour: 1940
 Gunsmith's Boy: 1942
 Young'Un: 1944
 Border Iron: 1945
 Whistle, Daughter, Whistle: 1947
 The Long Portage: A Story of Ticonderoga and Lord Howe: 1948
 Not Without Danger: A Story of the Colony of Jamaica in Revolutionary Days: 1951
 Watergate: A Story of the Irish on the Erie Canal: 1951
 Ranger's Ransom: 1953
 The Columbus Cannon: 1954
 Diane: 1954
 The Sea Warriors: 1959
 The Webfoot Warriors: The story of UDT, U.S. Navy's Underwater Demolition Team: 1962
 Underwater Warriors: Story of the American Frogmen: 1967

Desmond the Dog Detective series

 Desmond's First Case: 1961
 Desmond the Dog Detective: The Case of the Lone Stranger: 1962
 Desmond and the Peppermint Ghost: 1965
 Desmond and Dog Friday: 1968

With Erick Berry

 Men Who Changed the Map: 1968
 The Polynesian Triangle: 1968

References

1894 births
1980 deaths
20th-century American novelists
American children's writers
American male novelists
Newbery Honor winners
20th-century American male writers
Fellows of the Royal Geographical Society
Alumni of Queens' College, Cambridge
British emigrants to the United States